Yang Zhaoxuan and Zhang Yuxuan were the defending champions, but both players chose not to participate.

Hiroko Kuwata and Akiko Omae won the title, defeating Jacqueline Cako and Sabina Sharipova in the final, 6–1, 6–3.

Seeds

Draw

References 
 Draw

Suzhou Ladies Open - Doubles